Oregon Route 138 is an Oregon state highway that runs between the city of Elkton and a junction with U.S. Route 97 at Diamond Lake Junction.  The highway has several distinct stretches, and is the main east–west highway through Roseburg, and provides access to Crater Lake National Park from the north.  The highway is signed east–west.

Route description

Elkton-Sutherlin Highway 
Oregon Route 138 begins (at its western terminus) at a junction with Oregon Route 38 in Elkton. It heads due south from there, running alongside the Umpqua River. This section is the Elkton-Sutherlin Highway No. 231 (see Oregon highways and routes). In Sutherlin, OR 138 intersects with Interstate 5, and joins it, heading south. OR 138 and I-5 remain joined until the city of Roseburg. This section is part of the Pacific Highway No. 1. OR 138 exits from I-5 at Harvard Avenue, and heads east into downtown Roseburg. The downtown Roseburg section comprises part of Harvard, Oak, and Washington Avenues, and then part of the Oakland-Shady Highway, which is no longer a state highway.

North Umpqua Highway
OR 138 leaves Roseburg on the North Umpqua Highway No. 138 as it follows the Umpqua River's north fork.  It heads due east out of Roseburg, ascending into the Cascade mountains, and turning northeast.   Eventually, the highway turns south and reaches Diamond Lake, passing by the lake to the east.  Just south of there is an intersection with Oregon Route 230, which bypass Crater Lake National Park to the west.  South of there lies the north entrance to the park.  OR 138 continues east from the entrance, descending into Central Oregon, and terminates at an intersection with U.S. Route 97 at Diamond Lake Junction, south of the town of Chemult.

The portion of the highway between Roseburg and Diamond Lake is part of the Rogue-Umpqua Scenic Byway. The portion between former Route 209 and US 97 is part of the Volcanic Legacy Scenic Byway.

Major intersections

References

External links
Rogue-Umpqua Scenic Byway

138
Transportation in Klamath County, Oregon
Transportation in Douglas County, Oregon